Bhairava or Kala Bhairava is a deity worshiped by Hindus and Buddhists. Bhairava or Kala Bhairava may also refer to
Ashta Bhairava, the eight manifestations of Bhairava
Batuka Bhairava, a group of Indian gods
Bhairava Ashtami, a Hindu holy day 
Head of Bhairava, a mask belonging to Nepal’s Malla period

People
Kaala Bhairava, Indian playback singer and music director 

Films
Bhairava, a 1994 Kannada-language film 
Bhairava Dweepam, a 1994 Telugu-language film 
Bhairava Geetha, a 2018 Kannada-Telugu bilingual film 
Naga Kala Bhairava, a 1981 Kannada-language film